Serre's conjecture may refer to:

 Quillen–Suslin theorem, formerly known as Serre's conjecture
 Serre's conjecture II (algebra), concerning the Galois cohomology of linear algebraic groups
 Serre's modularity conjecture, concerning Galois representations
 Serre's multiplicity conjectures in commutative algebra
 Ribet's theorem, formerly known as Serre's epsilon conjecture

See also
 Jean-Pierre Serre